
Torgau is a town in Saxony, Germany.

Torgau may also refer to:

Geography
Torgau-Oschatz, a former district in Saxony, Germany from 1996 to 2008

History
League of Torgau, a 1526 alliance of Lutheran princes in Saxony
Battle of Torgau, a 1760 battle between Prussians and Austrians during the Seven Years' War
Siege of Torgau, a siege of Torgau in 1813–14 during the War of the Sixth Coalition

Games
Torgau (wargame), a 1974 board wargame that simulates the 1760 battle

Other
Torgau (horse), a thoroughbred race horse